Lintneria pseudostigmatica is a moth of the  family Sphingidae. It is known from Mexico.

It is similar in size and pattern to Lintneria eremitus, but the wings are slimmer, the ground colour of the head, thorax and forewing uppersides is more grey-brown, the abdomen underside is darker grey and the underside of both wings is more grey and less well-marked.

The larvae have been recorded feeding on Salvia ballotaeflora.

References

Lintneria
Moths described in 1928